is a velodrome located in Kawasaki, Kanagawa that conducts pari-mutuel Keirin racing - one of Japan's four authorized  where gambling is permitted. Its Keirin identification number for betting purposes is 34# (34 sharp).

Kawasaki's oval is 400 meters in circumference. A typical keirin race of 2,025 meters consists of five laps around the course.

Kawasaki Vélodrome is most convenient velodrome from Haneda airport in Tokyo. 

Regular free shuttle buses run from Kawasaki Railway Station East-Gate (bus stop No.21) to the Vélodrome with a journey time of around 5 minutes. Buses run every 20 minutes from 10:00am to 15:00.

See also
 Sports betting

External links
Kawasaki Keirin Home Page (Japanese)
keirin.jp Kawasaki Information (Japanese)

Velodromes in Japan
Cycle racing in Japan
Sports venues in Kawasaki, Kanagawa